EG (formerly Estates Gazette) is an established provider of data, news and analytics for the UK commercial property market. It was first published in 1858 and celebrated its 150th anniversary in 2008. 

In March 2008, Estates Gazette was announced as one of the top 500 "Business Superbrands" in the UK.

In 1996, Estates Gazette launched its own online property news and research arm, EGi. In 1997, the group launched Propertylink, the UK's largest free-access commercial property availability search website. 

EG is part of a portfolio of brands that belongs to LexisNexis Risk Solutions. The publication hosts its own "EG Awards" annually, the show being held in London each year.

References

See also
Estates Gazette Law Reports

1858 establishments in the United Kingdom
Business magazines published in the United Kingdom
Weekly magazines published in the United Kingdom
Magazines established in 1858
RELX